The Bakır shemaya (Alburnus attalus) is a species of ray-finned fish in the genus Alburnus. It is endemic to the Bakır River in western Anatolia, Turkey. It is threatened by river pollution and damming.

References

attalus
Endemic fauna of Turkey
Fish described in 2007
Taxa named by Müfit Özuluǧ
Taxa named by Jörg Freyhof
Endangered fish